Eugene Lytton Scott (December 28, 1937 – March 20, 2006) was an American tennis player, tournament director, author, and publisher. His active tennis career lasted from the 1950s to mid-1970s.

Early years
Scott was the grandson of Dr. Eugene C. Sullivan, one of the inventors of Pyrex and chair and president of Corning Glass Works. He graduated with a BA in history from Yale University in 1960, where he was a member of Skull and Bones and lettered in tennis, ice hockey, soccer, and lacrosse. He earned a law degree from the University of Virginia in 1964.

Tennis career
Scott's highest U.S. ranking as an amateur was No. 4 in 1963, and he reached as high as World No. 7 in 1967. At the time, he was a member of the United States Davis Cup team, and was both teammate and roommate of Arthur Ashe. They remained friends, and with Charlie Pasarell and Sheridan Snyder, founded the National Junior Tennis League in 1969. He founded the magazine Tennis Week in May 1974.

Later, Scott remained among the best players in the world in his age group. He won the USTA Men's 65 Clay Court Championships held at New Orleans Lawn Tennis Club in 2002. He won the USTA Men's 65 Grass Court Championships in September 2004 and the International Tennis Federation's Men's Super-Seniors World Individual Championships in the 65 division a week later. Scott also played real tennis at New York City's Racquet and Tennis Club.

Scott grew up in St. James, New York and played varsity hockey, track, soccer, and tennis at St. Mark's School in Southborough, Massachusetts.

Scott competed in the Davis Cup in 1963 and 1965, and his 1963 singles and doubles victories helped the United States win the Cup that year. Scott made it to the semifinals of the U.S. Championships at Forest Hills in 1967 and the quarterfinals of the French Championships in 1964. In 1963, he won the singles title at the Eastern Grass Court Championships in South Orange after a straight-sets victory in the final against compatriot Marty Riessen.

Although Scott remained active as a court tennis player, which he played at The Racquet Club on Park Avenue, he became one of the major figures in American tennis through his publication Tennis Week, which he founded, published, and edited. His editorials—perceptive, authoritative and sometimes whimsical—were considered a must read for all the game's insiders as well as a tennis public who became educated about the game as a result of reading them.

He was a mentor on and off court to Vitas Gerulaitis. Scott ran tournaments in New York and New Jersey for many years before taking over as tournament director of the ATP Masters at Madison Square Garden. In 1990, he was asked to start up the Kremlin Cup, an ATP event in Moscow, with a remit to produce with $1 million in sponsorship in nine months. With some assistance from the Kremlin, when Boris Yeltsin became president of Russia, Scott came up with Bayer as his first title sponsor and the tournament, played inside the vast Olympic Arena, immediately drew some of the largest crowds on the ATP tour.

Death and legacy
Scott died of amyloidosis at the age of 68 and was elected to the International Tennis Hall of Fame (ITHF) in 2008 in the "contributor" category. Since 2006, the ITHF annually presents the Eugene L. Scott Award to an individual who  "embodies Scott's commitment to communicating honestly and critically about the game, and who has had a significant impact on the tennis world."

References

External links
 Eugene L. Scott website
 
 
 
 

1937 births
2006 deaths
American magazine publishers (people)
American male tennis players
American real tennis players
People from St. James, New York
People from Southborough, Massachusetts
Sportspeople from Worcester County, Massachusetts
St. Mark's School (Massachusetts) alumni
International Tennis Hall of Fame inductees
Tennis people from Massachusetts
Tennis people from New York (state)
Yale Bulldogs men's tennis players
University of Virginia School of Law alumni
Tennis writers
Deaths from amyloidosis